Captain Sir William Bolton (1777 – 16 December 1830) was a post-captain in the Royal Navy who served under Nelson during the French Revolutionary Wars and was married to Dame Catherine Bolton, Nelson's niece. He also served in the Napoleonic Wars and the War of 1812.

Early life and family
Bolton was born at Ipswich, Suffolk, sometime in 1777 before 16 December, baptised 26 December, at St Matthew's Church, the son of Mary Woodthorpe and Rev. William Bolton, Rector of Brancaster and Hollesley, whose brother Thomas was married to Nelson's sister Susannah. His father passed on his taste for the classics and literature, and the family spent 1786–1787 in France, where Sir William became fluent in French.

On 18 May 1803, he married his first cousin Catherine Bolton (also known as Kitty), one of twin eldest daughters of Susannah Nelson and Thomas Bolton, at the home of Emma Hamilton at 23 Piccadilly. His father performed the ceremony; Nelson's sister Charlotte (later Duchess of Bronté) and Emma's daughter Emma Carew were witnesses. Catherine was sister of Thomas Bolton of Brickworth and Landford, in Wiltshire, later 2nd Earl Nelson.

Naval service and honours

On 20 June 1797, after having been recommended by Nelson to Earl St Vincent, he was appointed acting Lieutenant of  under Captain George Murray, an appointment confirmed on 11 August.

On 24 March 1803, Nelson recommended Bolton to the First Lord of the Admiralty, Lord St Vincent, to be sent to the Mediterranean, and in a letter to his sister Susannah a few days later expressed his interest in the welfare of this "excellent young man"; he repeated his request on July 4. On the day after Bolton's wedding, 19 May 1803, he was knighted and stood proxy for Nelson on the occasion of his being invested with the insignia of his last additional orders (as Nelson had already set off for Toulon).

He then successively commanded  (Jan 1806 – Jan 1808, mostly in the Channel),  (1808–1810) on the Irish station and then  (1810–1812) In these ships he served in the West Indies, Bay of Biscay, Ireland, around Madeira and the Azores. On 19 March 1809 Druid captured the schooner Belle Hortense; on 25 June the French private ship of war Jenny and her cargo; on 13 November 1809 Basque, French national brig (later ). On Endymion in November 1810, he captured the French privateer Milan of St. Malo, with 14 guns and 80 men.

After Endymion had been paid off at Plymouth in May 1812, Bolton retired to Burnham, Norfolk, and enjoyed a year's domestic respite.

On 19 September 1814 he captured American privateer brig Regent in Little Egg Harbor.

Soon after the Battle of Waterloo in June 1815, he was selected to convey the Duchess of Angoulême, Marie Thérèse of France to France, whose party included Mathieu de Montmorency, later French representative at the Congress of Verona in 1822.

Life after the navy
Sir William and Dame Catherine had 5 children, of whom only 3 daughters survived to adulthood – Emma Horatia (probably named after Emma Hamilton and her daughter Horatia Nelson), Mary Anne and Ellen Catherine (who married Dr Horatio Girdlestone, grandson of Susannah Nelson).

After retirement, Sir William resumed his passion for the classics, completely mastering Greek and finding amusement and pleasure in reading Greek and Roman writers, historians, satirists and poets. He also learnt German, Spanish and Italian.

He died at the age of 53 on 16 Dec 1830 at Costessey, and is buried at St Edmund's, with his parents buried there later. Some time later, after the death of Catherine and later her twin sister Jemima (aka Susanna), a memorial window was created in the church of St Mary's at Burnham Westgate, honouring them all.

Notes

References

Further reading
 

Alternative form of the "Biographical Memoir of the Late Captain Sir William Bolton, Knt, R.N.", cited many times above from the original in the United Service Journal: 

Royal Navy personnel of the French Revolutionary Wars
Royal Navy personnel of the Napoleonic Wars
Royal Navy personnel of the War of 1812
Royal Navy officers
Horatio Nelson
Knights Bachelor
1777 births
1830 deaths